Voreen (volume rendering engine) is an open-source volume visualization library and development platform. Through the use of GPU-based volume rendering techniques it allows high frame rates on standard graphics hardware to support interactive volume exploration.

History 
Voreen was initiated at the Department of Computer Science at the University of Münster, Germany in 2004 and was first released on 11 April 2008 under the
GNU general public license (GPL). Voreen is written in C++ utilizing the Qt framework and using the OpenGL
rendering acceleration API, and is able to achieve high interactive frame rates on consumer graphics hardware. It is platform independent and compiles on Windows and Linux. The source code and documentation, and also pre-compiled binaries for Windows and Linux, are available from its website. Although it is intended and mostly used for medical applications, any other kind of volume data can be handled, e.g., microscopy, flow data or other simulations.

Concepts 
The visualization environment VoreenVE based on that engine is designed for authoring
and performing interactive visualizations of volumetric data. Different visualizations
can be assembled in form of so-called networks via rapid prototyping,
with each network consisting of several processors. Processors perform more or less specialized tasks for the entire rendering process, ranging
from supplying data over raycasting, geometry creation and rendering to image processing. Within the limits
of their respective purposes, the processors can be combined freely with each other,
and thereby granting a great amount of flexibility and providing a uniform way of
handling volume rendering. Authors who need to implement a certain rendering
technique can confine their work basically on the development of new processors,
whereas users who only want to access a certain visualization simply need to employ
the appropriate processors or networks and do not need to care about technical
details.

Features 
Visualization
 Direct volume rendering (DVR), isosurface rendering, maximum intensity projection (MIP)
 Support of different illumination models (Phong reflection model, toon shading, ambient occlusion)
 Large (out-of-core) data visualization (using an OpenCL octree raycaster)
 Streamline-based vector field visualization
 Multimodal volume rendering
 Geometry rendering with support for order-independent transparency
 Flexible combination of image processing operators (depth darkening, glow, chromadepth, edge detection)
 Visualization of time-varying as well as segmented 3D datasets
 Support for 1D and 2D transfer functions/CLUTs
 Configurable views for building more complex applications (triple view/quad view/tabbed view/splitter)
 Plotting
 Volume Ensemble visualization (similarity plot, ensemble mean/variance, parallel coordinates)

Volume Processing
 Isosurface extraction
 Efficient basic 3D-image processing for very large (out-of-core) volumes
 Very large volume analysis (connected components, vessel network analysis)
 Interactive volume segmentation (random walker-based, vesselness filtering, basic thresholding)
 Interactive volume registration (manual or landmark-based)
 Vector field volume processing (Jacobian matrix, Delta/Q/Lambda2 vortex criterion, coreline extraction)
 Out-of-core processing of spatio-temporal multi-field ensemble datasets (ensemble analysis)

Interaction
 Configurable application mode for improving usability for domain experts
 Axis aligned and arbitrarily aligned clipping planes
 Editors for 1D and 2D transfer functions
 Inspection of intermediate results
 Distance measurements

Data I/O
 Support for several volume file formats (e.g. DICOM, TIFF stacks, HDF5, RAW, NetCDF, VTI, NIfTI-1)
 High-resolution screenshot and camera animation generation with anti-aliasing
 FFmpeg-based video export
 Python scripting for offline image processing and visualization
 Geometry in/export (e.g. for Additive Manufacturing)

See also 
 Volume rendering
 Volume ray casting

References

External links 
 Voreen website

Free data visualization software
Free 3D graphics software
Free software programmed in C++
3D imaging
Free DICOM software
Science software that uses Qt
Science software for Linux